Vibe is an entertainment channel available to customers of New Zealand satellite television provider Sky.

Launched as a basic tier channel, it was moved up a pay tier to the Entertainment Package in February 2018. The channel has a target demographic of all 25–54, with a female skew. Programming includes drama, factual and reality entertainment from the United States, UK, Canada, Australia and New Zealand. The channel does not directly commission local series, but plays New Zealand on Air funded titles including The Brokenwood Mysteries, which premieres on Sky-owned free-to-air channel Prime .

The channel's launch schedule featured programmes never before seen in New Zealand including Make Me A Supermodel with Rachel Hunter, Most Haunted, Tori & Dean: Inn Love, Katie & Peter, Desire, and Victoria Beckham: Coming to America.

References

External links

Television channels in New Zealand
English-language television stations in New Zealand